This page lists all described genera and species of the spider family Pycnothelidae. , the World Spider Catalog accepts 97 species in 6 genera:

A

Acanthogonatus

Acanthogonatus Karsch, 1880
 Acanthogonatus alegre Goloboff, 1995 — Chile
 Acanthogonatus birabeni Goloboff, 1995 — Argentina
 Acanthogonatus brunneus (Nicolet, 1849) — Chile
 Acanthogonatus campanae (Legendre & Calderón, 1984) — Chile
 Acanthogonatus centralis Goloboff, 1995 — Argentina
 Acanthogonatus chilechico Goloboff, 1995 — Chile
 Acanthogonatus confusus Goloboff, 1995 — Chile, Argentina
 Acanthogonatus ericae Indicatti, Lucas, Ott & Brescovit, 2008 — Brazil
 Acanthogonatus francki Karsch, 1880 (type) — Chile
 Acanthogonatus fuegianus (Simon, 1902) — Chile, Argentina
 Acanthogonatus hualpen Goloboff, 1995 — Chile
 Acanthogonatus huaquen Goloboff, 1995 — Chile
 Acanthogonatus incursus (Chamberlin, 1916) — Peru
 Acanthogonatus juncal Goloboff, 1995 — Chile
 Acanthogonatus minimus Indicatti, Folly-Ramos, Vargas, Lucas & Brescovit, 2015 — Brazil
 Acanthogonatus mulchen Goloboff, 1995 — Chile
 Acanthogonatus nahuelbuta Goloboff, 1995 — Chile
 Acanthogonatus notatus (Mello-Leitão, 1940) — Argentina
 Acanthogonatus parana Goloboff, 1995 — Argentina
 Acanthogonatus patagallina Goloboff, 1995 — Chile
 Acanthogonatus patagonicus (Simon, 1905) — Chile, Argentina
 Acanthogonatus peniasco Goloboff, 1995 — Chile
 Acanthogonatus pissii (Simon, 1889) — Chile
 Acanthogonatus quilocura Goloboff, 1995 — Chile
 Acanthogonatus recinto Goloboff, 1995 — Chile
 Acanthogonatus subcalpeianus (Nicolet, 1849) — Chile
 Acanthogonatus tacuariensis (Pérez-Miles & Capocasale, 1982) — Brazil, Uruguay
 Acanthogonatus tolhuaca Goloboff, 1995 — Chile
 Acanthogonatus vilches Goloboff, 1995 — Chile

B

Bayana

Bayana Pérez-Miles, Costa & Montes de Oca, 2014
 Bayana labordai Pérez-Miles, Costa & Montes de Oca, 2014 (type) — Brazil, Uruguay

S

Stanwellia
Use this template to add pictures

Stanwellia Rainbow & Pulleine, 1918
 Stanwellia annulipes (C. L. Koch, 1841) — Australia (Tasmania)
 Stanwellia bipectinata (Todd, 1945) — New Zealand
 Stanwellia grisea (Hogg, 1901) — Australia (Victoria)
 Stanwellia hapua (Forster, 1968) — New Zealand
 Stanwellia hoggi (Rainbow, 1914) (type) — Australia (New South Wales)
 Stanwellia hollowayi (Forster, 1968) — New Zealand
 Stanwellia houhora (Forster, 1968) — New Zealand
 Stanwellia inornata Main, 1972 — Australia (Victoria)
 Stanwellia kaituna (Forster, 1968) — New Zealand
 Stanwellia media (Forster, 1968) — New Zealand
 Stanwellia minor (Kulczyński, 1908) — Australia (New South Wales)
 Stanwellia nebulosa (Rainbow & Pulleine, 1918) — Australia (South Australia)
 Stanwellia occidentalis Main, 1972 — Australia (South Australia)
 Stanwellia pexa (Hickman, 1930) — Australia (Tasmania)
 Stanwellia puna (Forster, 1968) — New Zealand
 Stanwellia regia (Forster, 1968) — New Zealand
 Stanwellia taranga (Forster, 1968) — New Zealand
 Stanwellia tuna (Forster, 1968) — New Zealand

Stenoterommata

Stenoterommata Holmberg, 1881
Stenoterommata arnolisei Indicatti, Lucas, Ott & Brescovit, 2008 – Brazil
Stenoterommata bodoquena Ghirotto & Indicatti, 2021 – Brazil
Stenoterommata chavarii Ghirotto & Indicatti, 2021 – Brazil
Stenoterommata crassimana (Mello-Leitão, 1923) – Brazil
Stenoterommata crassistyla Goloboff, 1995 – Uruguay, Argentina
Stenoterommata curiy Indicatti, Lucas, Ott & Brescovit, 2008 – Brazil
Stenoterommata egric Ghirotto & Indicatti, 2021 – Brazil
Stenoterommata grimpa Indicatti, Lucas, Ott & Brescovit, 2008 – Brazil
Stenoterommata gugai Indicatti, Chavari, Zucatelli-Júnior, Lucas & Brescovit, 2017 – Brazil
Stenoterommata iguazu Goloboff, 1995 – Argentina
Stenoterommata isa (Nicoletta, Panchuk, Peralta-Seen & Ferretti, 2022) – Argentina
Stenoterommata leporina (Simon, 1891) – Brazil
Stenoterommata leticiae Indicatti, Chavari, Zucatelli-Júnior, Lucas & Brescovit, 2017 – Brazil
Stenoterommata luederwaldti (Mello-Leitão, 1923) – Brazil
Stenoterommata maculata (Bertkau, 1880) – Brazil
Stenoterommata melloleitaoi Guadanucci & Indicatti, 2004 – Brazil
Stenoterommata neodiplornata Ghirotto & Indicatti, 2021 – Brazil
Stenoterommata palmar Goloboff, 1995 – Brazil, Argentina
Stenoterommata pavesii Indicatti, Chavari, Zucatelli-Júnior, Lucas & Brescovit, 2017 – Brazil
Stenoterommata peri Indicatti, Chavari, Zucatelli-Júnior, Lucas & Brescovit, 2017 – Brazil
Stenoterommata pescador Indicatti, Chavari, Zucatelli-Júnior, Lucas & Brescovit, 2017 – Brazil
Stenoterommata platensis Holmberg, 1881 (type) – Argentina
Stenoterommata quena Goloboff, 1995 – Argentina
Stenoterommata sevegnaniae Indicatti, Chavari, Zucatelli-Júnior, Lucas & Brescovit, 2017 – Brazil
Stenoterommata tenuistyla Goloboff, 1995 – Argentina
Stenoterommata uruguai Goloboff, 1995 – Argentina

References

Pycnothelidae